Hydrogenobacter is a genus of bacteria, one of the few in the phylum Aquificota. Type species is H. thermophilus. This genus belongs to Bacteria as opposed to the other inhabitants of extreme environments, the Archaea.

Phylogeny
The currently accepted taxonomy is based on the List of Prokaryotic names with Standing in Nomenclature (LPSN) and National Center for Biotechnology Information (NCBI)

See also 
 List of bacterial orders
 List of bacteria genera

References

Bacteria genera
Aquificota
Thermophiles